See :Category:People from Leeds
List of people from Leeds is a list of notable people from the City of Leeds in West Yorkshire, England. This list includes people from the historic settlement, and the wider metropolitan borough, and thus may include people from Horsforth, Morley, Pudsey, Otley and Wetherby and other areas of the city. This list is arranged alphabetically by surname:



A

 Arthur Louis Aaron VC DFM – recipient of the Victoria Cross in 1943
 Carl Ablett – former Rugby League footballer who played for the Leeds Rhinos
 Les "Juicy" Adams – rugby league footballer who played for Leeds, Huddersfield and Castleford.
 Nicola Adams OBE – first female boxer to win an Olympic gold medal
 Joseph Aspdin – inventor of Portland cement
 H. H. Asquith – 1st Earl of Oxford & Asquith, KG, PC, KC, Liberal Prime Minister of the UK from 1908 to 1916
 Alfred Atkinson VC – recipient of the Victoria Cross in 1900
 Alfred Austin DL – poet laureate

B
 Ryan Bailey – rugby league player who plays for Leeds Rhinos and has represented Great Britain and England
Corinne Bailey Rae – singer
 Christopher Paul Baker (1955) – award-winning travel writer, photographer, and adventure motorcyclist, spent his early years in Woodlesford, outside Leeds
 Mark Ballard – Green politician
 Julian Barratt – actor and musician best known for his character Howard Moon in the cult comedy series The Mighty Boosh
 Michael Barratt – Television presenter and journalist, best known for his period as the main presenter of Nationwide from 1969 to 1977.
 David Batty – former Leeds United Midfielder, now living in Filey
 Adam Baynes – parliamentary army officer during the English Civil War and MP for Leeds during the Commonwealth; as such the first MP for the city
 Richard Beck – rugby union player for Leeds Carnegie
 Alan Bennett – performer (notably in Beyond the Fringe), playwright (e.g. The Madness of George III, Talking Heads) and scriptwriter (including The Madness of King George)
 Ivy Benson – bandleader
 Richard Bentley – classical scholar, critic, and theologian of the 17th century; served as Master of Trinity College, Cambridge
 Robert Blackburn OBE, FRAeS – aviation pioneer
 Olivia Blake – MP for Sheffield Hallam
 Andy Bolton – power-lifter, current super-heavyweight deadlift and squat world record holder
 Barbara Taylor Bradford OBE – novelist
 Jack Brett – professional motorcycle racer
 [Frances Brody]] – author of Kate Shackelton mysteries.
 Melanie Brown – "Mel B" from the Spice Girls
 Rampage Brown – British professional wrestler
 Alistair Brownlee MBE – triathlon world champion and Olympic gold medalist
 Jonathan Brownlee – triathlon world champion and Olympic bronze medalist
 Beryl Burton OBE – record-breaking cyclist
 William Boynton Butler VC – recipient of the Victoria Cross in 1917

 Stan Stevenson-Byrne – Going by the alias Fox Stevenson, Stan is a DJ most known for his debut album, Dreamland.

C
 Laurence Calvert VC, MM – recipient of the Victoria Cross in 1918
 Danny Care – Harlequins and England rugby union scrum-half
 Sean Carr – singer; husband of Yevhenia Carr (daughter of Ukrainian politician Yulia Tymoshenko)
 Phil Carrick – cricketer who captained Yorkshire
 Thomas Chippendale – furniture maker, from Farnley, Otley
 Dave Clark – Sky Sports presenter
 Howard Clark – Walker Cup and Ryder Cup golfer
 Chris Clarkson – rugby league footballer who plays for the Leeds Rhinos
 Jon Clay – Olympic bronze medallist
 Brian Close – cricketer who captained Yorkshire, youngest man ever to play Test cricket for England
 Sean Conlon – singer best known as a member of boy band Five
 Jackson Conway – footballer for Atlanta United
 Christian Cooke – actor
 John Craven OBE – presenter of John Craven's Newsround (now known as Newsround)
 Paul Crowther – philosopher, university lecturer and author
 Barry Cryer – comedian

D
Ellen Wordsworth Darwin (1856–1903) – academic and Fellow of Newnham College, Cambridge
 Rowan Deacon – director and filmmaker
 Brian Deane – former Leeds United centre forward (retired)
 Lizzie Deignan – (née Armitstead; born 18 December 1988); professional world champion track and road racing cyclist. Silver medalist at the 2012 Summer Olympics road race.
 Emmanuel Dieseruvwe – footballer who plays for Salford City
 David Doherty – rugby union player
 Jeremy Dyson – writer and member of The League of Gentlemen

E

 E. R. Eddison CB, CMG – fantasy writer, The Worm Ouroboros
 Andrew Edge (b. David Andrew Edge) – drummer for the Thompson Twins, Uropa Lula, Savage Progress, singer with Yoyo, and currently working in Austria with Drumsing
 Tom Elliott – footballer, currently playing for Salford City

F
 Thomas Fairfax, 3rd Lord Fairfax of Cameron – general and parliamentary commander-in-chief during the English Civil War
 Gaynor Faye – known for her characters in Coronation Street and Fat Friends and winning the first series of Dancing on Ice
 Arthur Foxton Ferguson – baritone, lecturer, and German translator, founded the Folk-Song Quartet
 John Fieldhouse, Baron Fieldhouse  – Royal Navy officer who commanded five submarines and a frigate before being given responsibility for Operation Corporate, the mission to recover the Falkland Islands
 Helen Fielding – novelist and screenwriter, best known as the creator of the fictional character Bridget Jones
 Caleb Folan – former footballer who played for Leeds United, Rushden and Diamonds and Hull City, amongst others
 Isabella Ford – socialist and feminist from Headingley
 James Frain – actor
 Leigh Francis, aka Avid Merrion – creator of the TV show Bo' Selecta! and Keith Lemon

G
 Barney Gibson – Yorkshire cricketer; in April 2011 he became the youngest cricketer to play first-class cricket in England, making his debut aged 15 years and 27 days
 Angela Griffin – actress in Coronation Street, Emmerdale and Waterloo Road
 John Atkinson Grimshaw – Victorian-era artist
 Geoff Gunney MBE – rugby league player for Hunslet and represented Great Britain. 579 appearances for Hunslet.

H

 Erling Haaland – footballer who represents Norway and plays for Manchester City
 Ryan Hall – rugby league footballer who plays for the Leeds Rhinos and has represented England
 Willis Hall – playwright and radio and television writer, including Billy Liar and Worzel Gummidge with Leeds-born collaborator Keith Waterhouse
 Ellery Hanley MBE – rugby league player, represented Great Britain and won the Rugby League Golden Boot
 Anne Lyon Hansen – nurse
 John Harrison – prominent woollen cloth merchant; mayor of Leeds during the 16th and 17th centuries
 Tony Harrison – poet
 David Harvey – football goalkeeper played for Leeds United and Scotland; Scotland's most successful post-war goalkeeper
 Chris Haskett – guitarist who has worked with Rollins Band, David Bowie and Tool, that lived at 52 Harold Mount between 1982 and 1987.
 Charlie Heaton – actor and musician born in Leeds, known for Stranger Things
 Kevin Hector – footballer, former player for Derby County
 Kim-Joy Hewlett – baker and cookbook author
 Oliver Hindle – singer-songwriter and music producer best known for his solo project Superpowerless
 Frazer Hines – actor in Emmerdale and Doctor Who
 David Philip Hirsch VC – recipient of the Victoria Cross in 1917
 Damien Hirst – artist, entrepreneur and art collector (Born in Bristol, raised in Leeds)
 Matthew Hoggard MBE – cricketer for Yorkshire and England
 General J N R (Nick) Houghton KCB, CBE – former Chief of the Defence Staff
 Richard Hoggart FRSL (24 September 1918–10 April 2014) – a British academic whose career covered the fields of sociology, English literature and cultural studies, with emphasis on British popular culture.
Thomas Houseago - artist and sculptor
 Jonny Howson – footballer who played for Leeds United and England under-21, currently for Middlesbrough in the EFL Championship
 Paul Hunter – snooker player, died October 2006 from cancer
 Hasib Hussain – Islamic terrorist who murdered 13 people during the 7 July 2005 London bombings
 Sir Leonard Hutton Kt – cricketer, appointed as England's first professional cricket captain in 1952

I
 Ray Illingworth CBE – England and Yorkshire cricket captain
 William H. Illingworth – Wild West pioneer photographer
 Michael Ivey – First-class cricketer

J
 Michael Jackson – writer and journalist, particularly on beer and whisky
 Carl Johanneson – Super-Featherweight boxer and ranked number 2 in Europe in his weight class
 Charles Jones – cricketer and field hockey player
 Jamie Jones-Buchanan – rugby league footballer who plays for the Leeds Rhinos, and has represented both England and Great Britain

K
 Gerald Kaufman – Labour politician
 James Keinhorst – rugby league player who represents Leeds Rhinos and Germany
 Geoffrey Studdert Kennedy MC – Anglican priest, soldier, and poet, who became known as 'Woodbine Willie' during the First World War for giving Woodbine cigarettes along with spiritual aid to injured and dying soldiers
 Mohammad Sidique Khan – Islamic terrorist who led the 7 July 2005 London bombings
 Ian King – cricketer
 Patric Knowles – film actor who was inducted into the Hollywood Walk of Fame

L

 Jon Lancaster – racing driver
 Benjamin Henry Latrobe – neoclassical architect, best known for his design of the United States Capitol
 Samuel Ledgard – bus pioneer
 Aaron Lennon – footballer, started at Leeds United, now playing for Kayserispor in Turkey
 Matthew Lewis – actor, best known for his role as Neville Longbottom in the Harry Potter film series
 Gabby Logan – TV sports presenter; daughter of Terry Yorath, former Leeds Utd footballer and Wales Manager
 Sir Charles Lupton – Lord Mayor of Leeds 1915, co-founder of a law firm that became Dibb Lupton Alsop, (shortened to DLA), precursor to global law firm DLA Piper, with a prime office in Leeds
 Lupton family – prominent land-owning family of woollen cloth merchants and manufacturers in Georgian and Victorian Leeds through to the mid 20th century.

M
 Owney Madden – Prohibition-era gangster
 Paul Madeley – footballer with 711 appearances for Leeds United 1964–80 in every position except goalkeeper
 Albert Mallinson (1870-1946) – composer and organist
 Alexandra Mardell (born 1993) – actress
 Henry Rowland Marsden – Liberal Mayor of Leeds 1873-1875
 Samuel Marsden (1764–1838) – The "Flogging Parson", magistrate of Parramatta, New South Wales; missionary to New Zealand
 Tim Marshall – Foreign Affairs Editor for Sky News, who has reported in a number of war zones
 Phil May – caricaturist
 Nell McAndrew – model; has appeared in Playboy magazine and was a contestant on I'm a Celebrity, Get Me Out of Here!
 Malcolm McDowell – actor; played the wizard in Just Visiting, starred in A Clockwork Orange, Caligula, and Star Trek Generations 
 Sir Ian McGeechan OBE – former rugby union player and coach; represented Scotland and the British and Irish Lions; currently chief executive of Leeds Carnegie
 Danny McGuire – rugby league player for Leeds Rhinos
 Michael McIlorum – rugby League footballer
 Edward McKenna VC – recipient of the Victoria Cross in 1863
 Frederick McNess VC – recipient of the Victoria Cross in 1916
 Scott McNiven – footballer who plays for Farsley Celtic
 Paul McShane – rugby league footballer who plays for the Leeds Rhinos
 Samuel Meekosha VC – recipient of the Victoria Cross in 1915
 Kay Mellor OBE – writer of TV drama including Band of Gold
 Nigel Melville – rugby union player for Otley, Wakefield and Wasps; England Captain in 1980s (retired)
 Michael Middleton – father of the Princess of Wales; grandfather of Prince George of Wales, Princess Charlotte of Wales and Prince Louis of Wales
 Trevor Midgley – Beau (folk singer/songwriter)
 Isaac Milner – 18th-century mathematician, abolitionist, inventor, and the President of Queens' College, Cambridge and Lucasian Professor of Mathematics
 James Milner – footballer currently playing for Liverpool FC
 Joseph Milner FRS – 18th-century evangelical divine
 Nick Mohammed – actor, comedian, writer of including a number of hit sitcoms (e.g. Intelligence, Ted Lasso)
 James Roderick "Jim" Moir – comedian better known as Vic Reeves
 Angela Morley – composer (formerly known as Wally Stott)
 Adam Moran – Competitive Eater currently ranked #11 in Major League Eating's rankings
 Bryan Mosley OBE – actor, 'Alf Roberts' in Coronation Street
 Albert Mountain VC – recipient of the Victoria Cross in 1918
 Chris Moyles – Radio X DJ
 Berkeley Moynihan, 1st Baron Moynihan KCB,  – British Major-General of the First World War; surgeon
 Simon Musk – professional wrestler under the name El Ligero

N
 Philip Naviasky – artist
 Richard Naylor – retired footballer, currently coaching the Leeds United Academy
 Adelaide Neilson (real name Elizabeth Ann Brown) – Victorian actress

O
 Richard Oastler – 19th-century reformer
 Jonathan Robert Ogden – 19th-century composer
 Michael O'Grady – former footballer who played for Leeds United and England between 1962 and 1969
 Thomas Osborne, 1st Duke of Leeds KG – 17th-century Whig statesman; a signatory of the Invitation to William
 Lucy Osburn – 19th-century nurse
 Peter O'Toole – acclaimed stage and screen actor

P
 Joseph Arthur Padway – American Socialist politician, Wisconsin State Senate
 Jeremy Paxman – TV presenter
 Jamie Peacock MBE – rugby league player, former Leeds Rhinos and Great Britain captain
 Billy Pearce – Comedian (stand-up and pantomime)
 John Pearson VC, MSM - recipient of the Victoria Cross in 1858
 Bob Peck (1945–1999) – stage, film, TV and voiceover actor; attended Leeds Modern School, graduated from Leeds College of Art; acted for the Royal Shakespeare Company and the Royal National Theatre; starred in more than 20 TV dramas; known for Edge of Darkness, Jurassic Park
 David Pennett – former cricketer
 Adam Perry – drummer for the Bloodhound Gang
 Caryl Phillips – author, playwright
 Kalvin Phillips – footballer, who started his career at Leeds United and is currently with Manchester City.
 Gordon Pirie – middle-distance runner, silver medal winner in 5,000 metres, 1956 Olympics
 Joseph Priestley FRS – 18th-century enlightenment theologian, dissenting clergyman, natural philosopher, chemist, educator, and political theorist who published over 150 works

Q 

 Bertha Quinn – suffragette, socialist, Labour councillor 1929–1943, recipient of Papal Bene Merenti Medal 1946

R
 Harry Ramsden – founder of Harry Ramsden's Fish and Chips chain
 Arthur Ransome – journalist and children's author (most notably Swallows and Amazons)
 Francis Rattenbury – architect who designed several well-known Canadian buildings
 Paul Reaney – footballer who played for Leeds United and England between 1962 and 1978; born in Fulham but grew up in Leeds
 Mike Redway – Singer, songwriter, record producer, musician
 Andrew J. Richards  astronomy professor and scientist
 Micah Richards – Former England footballer, now acting as a TV pundit. He played for Manchester City for 10 years coming through the youth ranks. He has won the Premiership, FA Cup and Carling Cup trophies. He attended Wetherby High School, Leeds but was born in Birmingham (when his mother was visiting relatives)
 Jason Robinson OBE – rugby league player for Hunslet, Wigan and Great Britain; switched codes and played in 2003 World Cup for England; has since captained England Rugby Union
 Peter Robinson – crime novelist best known for his novels set in Yorkshire featuring Inspector Alan Banks
 Stella Rotenberg – poet and Shoah victim
 Katie Rushworth – Television gardener on ITV's Love Your Garden
 Paul & Barry Ryan – pop-singing duo; Barry had a solo career after Paul withdrew to songwriting
 Sue Ryder CMG, OBE – British peeress who worked with Special Operations Executive in the Second World War and afterwards led many charitable organizations, notably the Sue Ryder charity

S

 Sir Titus Salt, 1st Baronet – businessman and philanthropist, founder of Saltaire
 Lloyd Sam – footballer, currently playing for New York Red Bulls
 George Sanders – VC, MC - recipient of the Victoria Cross in 1916 and the Military Cross in 1918
 Jimmy Savile OBE – disgraced former DJ and presenter, Jim'll Fix It and Top of the Pops
 Garry Schofield OBE – rugby league player, represented Great Britain and won the Rugby League Golden Boot
 Anne Shaw (Mason) – potter and ceramic sculptor, founded Haworth Pottery
 Jack Shepherd – actor, starred as TV cop Wycliffe
 Paul Shepherd – ex-Leeds United player
 Mick Shoebottom – Nicknamed "Shoey", was an English professional rugby league footballer who played in the 1960s and 1970s for Great Britain, England, Yorkshire and Leeds RL
Florence Shufflebottom, circus performer
 John Simm – actor, Life on Mars and Doctor Who
 Emile Sinclair – semi-professional footballer 
 John Smeaton FRS – civil engineer and physicist responsible for the design of bridges, canals, harbours and lighthouses throughout England
 Alan Smith – former Leeds United striker now retired
 Lee Smith – former London Wasps rugby union player, now playing for rugby league side Wakefield Trinity Wildcats
 Philip Stone – actor, Indiana Jones and the Temple of Doom, The Shining and A Clockwork Orange
 Marilyn Stowe – divorce lawyer and TV relationship expert
 Billy Sutcliffe – cricketer who captained Yorkshire
 Charles Stross – science fiction author

T
 Tom Taiwo - footballer
 Barry Tebb (born 1942) – poet, novelist, editor, publisher and mental health campaigner 
 Joshua Tetley (1778–1859)  founder of the Tetley's Brewery in Leeds
 Charles Thackrah – pioneering surgeon in occupational medicine, a founder member of the Leeds School of Medicine; died of tuberculosis in 1833, at the age of 38
 Charles Thackray – pioneer of medical devices and instruments that led to modern hip replacement surgery
 Emma-Jean Thackray – jazz trumpeter, dj, singer, composer and producer
 Jake Thackray – folk singer
 Jamie Thackray – rugby league player formerly of Leeds Rhinos
 Ralph Thoresby (1658–1724) – first historian of Leeds 
 Sally Timms – singer with the band The Mekons
 Mike Tindall MBE – England and Gloucester rugby union outside centre, from Otley
 Christopher Tolkien (1924–2020) – born in Leeds, the third son of the author J. R. R. Tolkien (1892–1973), and the editor of much of his father's posthumously published work.
 Jane Tomlinson CBE – raised £1.75m for cancer charities through endurance sports events after diagnosis of terminal breast cancer; died 3 September 2007
 Liz Truss MP – former Conservative prime minister of the United Kingdom, grew up in Leeds and attended Roundhay School.

V

 Hedley Verity – England cricketer; playing for Yorkshire he took all 10 Nottinghamshire wickets for 10 runs on 12 July 1932
 Vesta Victoria – music-hall star

W
 Chev Walker – English Rugby Union player for Bath RFC, formerly a professional rugby league footballer for Leeds Rhinos and Great Britain
 Charles Ward VC – recipient of the Victoria Cross in 1900
 Mickey Walker (golfer) – former Solheim Cup captain
 Stevie Ward – rugby league footballer who plays for the Leeds Rhinos
 Josh Warrington – former IBF featherweight boxing champion from 2018 to January 2021
 Keith Waterhouse CBE – author of Billy Liar
 Fanny Waterman DBE – international concert pianist; co-founder of the Leeds International Piano Competition 
 Jordan Watson – kickboxer
 Frank Atha Westbury (1838–1901) – author of mystery adventure novels, children's stories and poetry in late 19th-century Australia and New Zealand
 Noel Whelan – footballer who played for Leeds United, Coventry City and Middlesbrough F.C.
 Aidan White – footballer who played for Leeds United. Now plays for Heart of Midlothian
Craig White – cricketer who captained Yorkshire
 Jack White VC (born Jacob Weiss) – recipient of the Victoria Cross in 1917
 Marco Pierre White – celebrity chef and restaurateur
 Sir Denys Wilkinson – nuclear physicist
 John Grimshaw Wilkinson – visually impaired botanist
 Tom Wilkinson OBE – actor, Batman Begins, Eternal Sunshine of the Spotless Mind and The Full Monty
 Geoffrey Wilson – cricketer who captained Yorkshire
 Ernie Wise OBE (real name Ernest Wiseman) – of the comedy duo Morecambe and Wise
 Frank Wormald CB – British army officer, served in the Second Boer War and First World War, earned the rank of Brigadier General, died leading troops on the Western Front
 Stevie Wright – The Easybeats frontma. born in Leeds but emigrated to Australia

Z
 Alex Zane – TV presenter and DJ

See also
 List of people from West Yorkshire

Notes

References
 

 
Leeds
Lists of people by city in the United Kingdom
People